My World is an album by the American musician Ray Charles, released in 1993. Charles incorporated elements of gospel, funk, and New jack swing.

The album peaked at No. 145 on the Billboard 200. "A Song for You" won a Grammy Award, in the "Best R&B Vocal Performance, Male" category.

Production
The album was produced by Richard Perry. Charles covered Leon Russell's "A Song for You" and Paul Simon's "Still Crazy After All These Years". Mavis Staples duetted with Charles on "Love Has a Mind of Its Own". Billy Preston and Eric Clapton also contributed to My World.

Critical reception

Rolling Stone wrote: "Over the years, a benign, grandfatherly quality has crept into Charles's singing. In bringing this amused overview to 'Still Crazy', Charles turns the Simon gem into a jubilant, frisky declaration of independence by a proud eccentric." Ebony stated that Charles "continues to infuse his music with social messages, smooth productions and rhythmic funk."

The Chicago Tribune noted that "producer Richard Perry inexplicably insists on separating the Genius from his keyboards; that's a cardinal sin." Newsday  called the album "surprisingly potent, awash in rhythms and production techniques not even imagined when Ray first entered a studio." The Baltimore Sun concluded that "what Brother Ray needs first and foremost are songs, and when you hear how much he makes of a classic, Paul Simon's 'Still Crazy After All These Years', it suddenly becomes obvious how cut-rate the rest of the writing here is."

AllMusic wrote that the album "marked an attempt to somewhat 'modernize' Ray Charles by incorporating elements of hip-hop and New Jack swing into his trademark sound."

Track listing

References

Ray Charles albums
Albums produced by Richard Perry
1993 albums
Warner Records albums